or simply Mount Katsuragi is a mountain in the Kongō Range straddling the prefectural border between Chihayaakasaka, Osaka and Gose, Nara in Japan. The mountain is located along the Gose Line of the Kintetsu Railway.

The base of the mountain has many different Shinto shrines and Buddhist temples. The mountain is accessible via the Katsuragisan Ropeway on the east side, as well as several different hiking trails on all sides of varying difficulty and length. The summit has a local government-run lodge and campground for those who want to spend the night or rest after ascending Mount Yamato Katsuragi.

Other names for the mountain include Mount Kaina, Mount Kamo, Mount Tenshin, and Shinoga Peak.

Location and naming
It is part of the Kongō Range. Mount Yamato Katsuragi has gently sloping sides which rise from the neighboring Katsuragi Plateau. The mountain was produced by orogenic folding, and is composed of schistose granite overlaid with a shallow layer of sandy and gravelly alluvial soil.

The Kongō Range was formerly known as the  before being renamed to its current title.

Access and amenities
The ropeway is operated by Kintetsu Railway.

Tozanguchi Station is accessed by taking a bus from stop three in front of Kintetsu Gose Station (which is directly across the street from JR's Gose Station). The ride to Tozanguchi Station is between 15–20 minutes.

A number of hiking trails are accessible from all sides of Mount Yamato Katsuragi. The  weaves under the ropeway as it goes up the mountain, taking about 70–80 minutes for the ascent. The  follows a northwest path before curving back toward the southwest. It takes about 2 hours to ascend the mountain via this trail.

This trail takes around 3.5 hours to hike. There are the same fields of rhododendrons about 30 minutes from the summit along this trail.

On the Osaka side of the mountain, there are four different trails to choose from. One starts at the Kano bus stop near Shiraki Elementary School in Kanan, which takes about 4 hours to hike. Hiking the trail starting at the Kauchi bus stop near Kauchi Elementary takes about just over 3 hours. Starting on the south at the entrance to the Mizukoshi Tunnel (on Route 309) gives you two different trails (one going east and the other going west), and the hiking time is about the same for each route. The east route will take you by Tsutsujien, a park full of rhododendrons just south of the lodge.

, operated by the local government, offers overnight lodging and food for up to 70 people in 17 different rooms. The lodge includes a gift shop carrying local specialty foods, and has traditional ofuro bathing. The lodge also operates a campground just to the northeast of the summit along the north trail.

Environs
The city of Katsuragi maintains two city parks near the base of the mountain.  is just northeast of the base of the mountain. Both parks offer good views of Mount Yamato Katsuragi as well as other mountains in the area.

There are a number of Shinto shrines and Buddhist temples near Mount Yamato Katsuragi. They are listed alphabetically.

Gallery

References

External links

City of Gose - Sightseeing Guide 
Mount Katsuragi Latest News 
Katsuragi Kogen Lodge 

Mountains of Nara Prefecture
Mountains of Osaka Prefecture